Dlhá Ves is a village and municipality in the Rožňava District in the Košice Region of eastern Slovakia.

History
In historical records the village was first mentioned in 1332.

Geography
The village lies at an altitude of 330 metres and covers an area of 10.760 km².
It has a population of about 600 people.

Culture
The village has a small public library and a football pitch.

Genealogical resources

The records for genealogical research are available at the state archive "Statny Archiv in Banska Bystrica,  Kosice, Slovakia"

 Roman Catholic church records (births/marriages/deaths): 1852-1896 (parish B)
 Reformed Church records (births/marriages/deaths): 1701-1895 (parish B)

See also
 List of municipalities and towns in Slovakia

External links
 Dlhá Ves
https://web.archive.org/web/20071116010355/http://www.statistics.sk/mosmis/eng/run.html

Villages and municipalities in Rožňava District